Owenton is a home rule-class city in and the county seat of Owen County, Kentucky, United States. The population was 1,327 at the 2010 census.  It is located at the junction of U.S. Route 127 and Kentucky Route 22, about halfway between Louisville and Cincinnati.

History
Owenton was founded in 1822 and named for its county, which was named for Col. Abraham Owen, a pioneer who died at the Battle of Tippecanoe. The town was first incorporated on December 18, 1828, although it had to be reincorporated in 1849. The Greek Revival courthouse was built between 1857 and 1858. Owenton's growth in the late 19th century was limited because a railroad was never built to it.

Geography
Owenton is located at  (38.536614, -84.839363).

Demographics

As of the census of 2000, there were 1,387 people, 615 households, and 340 families residing in the city. The racial makeup of the city was 95.39% White, 2.88% African American, 0.58% Asian, 0.07% Pacific Islander, 0.58% from other races, and 0.50% from two or more races. Hispanic or Latino of any race were 1.73% of the population.

There were 615 households, out of which 24.7% had children under the age of 18 living with them, 38.9% were married couples living together, 12.8% had a female householder with no husband present, and 44.7% were non-families. 42.3% of all households were made up of individuals, and 25.2% had someone living alone who was 65 years of age or older. The average household size was 2.08 and the average family size was 2.84.

In the city, the population was spread out, with 20.8% under the age of 18, 8.6% from 18 to 24, 22.4% from 25 to 44, 20.9% from 45 to 64, and 27.3% who were 65 years of age or older. The median age was 44 years. For every 100 females, there were 71.9 males. For every 100 females age 18 and over, there were 65.3 males.

The median income for a household in the city was $23,125, and the median income for a family was $36,806. Males had a median income of $27,596 versus $22,450 for females. The per capita income for the city was $14,955. About 13.2% of families and 21.4% of the population were below the poverty line, including 21.9% of those under age 18 and 28.0% of those age 65 or over.

Education
Owenton has a lending library, the Owen County Public Library.

Notable people

Gerald W. Johnson (1919–2002), a lieutenant general in the USAF and World War II flying ace.
Willis A. Lee (1888-1945), U.S. Navy vice admiral in World War II and Olympic gold medalist.
Joseph L. Rhinock (1863–1926), a U.S. Representative from Kentucky.
Dale Roberts (1940–2010), an American relief pitcher in Major League Baseball who played for the New York Yankees
Abraham O. Smoot (1815–1895), a Mormon pioneer and second Mayor of Salt Lake City, Utah.
Arnold E. True (1901–1979), a highly decorated Rear admiral in the U.S. Navy during World War II.

References

Further reading

Cities in Owen County, Kentucky
County seats in Kentucky
Cities in Kentucky
1822 establishments in Kentucky